Dry Fork or Dryfork may refer to:

Rivers
 Dry Fork (Bourbeuse River tributary), a stream in Gasconade and Maries counties Missouri
 Dry Fork (Cedar Creek tributary), a stream in Callaway County, Missouri
 Dry Fork (Charrette Creek tributary), a stream in Warren County, Missouri
 Dry Fork (Grassy Creek tributary), a stream in Pike County, Missouri
 Dry Fork (Loutre River tributary), a stream  in Montgomery County, Missouri
 Dry Fork (Meramec River tributary), a stream in Crawford, Dent and Phelps counties Missouri
 Dry Fork (North Moreau Creek tributary), a stream in Moniteau County, Missouri
 Dry Fork (Plattin Creek tributary), a stream in Jefferson, St. Francois and Ste. Genevieve counties in Missouri
 Dry Fork (Pomme de Terre River tributary), a stream in Polk County, Missouri
 Dry Fork (Salt River tributary), a stream  in Ralls County, Missouri
 Dry Fork (White Oak Creek tributary), a stream in Pittsylvania County, Virginia
 Dry Fork (Cheat River tributary), Dry Fork of the Cheat River in West Virginia
 Dry Fork (Tug Fork tributary), Dry Fork of the Tug Fork in Virginia and West Virginia

Communities
 Dry Fork, Kentucky
 Dry Fork, Bland County, Virginia
 Dry Fork, Pittsylvania County, Virginia
 Dry Fork, West Virginia
 Dry Fork Township, Carroll County, Arkansas

Other
 Dry Fork Mine, a coal mine located in Gillette, Wyoming
 Dry Fork Plantation